Glenmornan is a hamlet in County Tyrone, Northern Ireland. It is in the townland of Brownhill, northeast of Strabane, and southeast of Artigarvan. In the 2001 Census it had a population of 78 people. Glenmornan is in the Strabane District Council area.

Sport
Owen Roe O'Neill's GAC is the local Gaelic Athletic Association club.

References 

Villages in County Tyrone